Suning Appliance Group Co., Ltd.  is a Chinese holding company that is the third largest shareholder of Suning Appliance (also known as Suning Domestic Appliance in 1996, Suning Appliance Chain Store (Group) in 2001, Suning Commerce Group from 2013 to 2018, and Suning.com now), after Zhang Jindong (founder of Suning) and Alibaba Group.

The company was formerly known as Jiangsu Suning Appliance Co., Ltd. and Jiangsu Suning Appliance Group Co., Ltd..

History
As at 2002, Jiangsu Suning Appliance Group Co., Ltd. was owned by the ex-senior staff of Suning Appliance Co., Ltd., namely Liu Xiaomeng, Zhang Jindong, Sun Weimin (CEO of Suning) and Chen Jinfeng for 42%, 28%, 18% and 12% stake respectively. The company owned several real estate and leased to Suning Domestic Appliance. When Suning Domestic Appliance was listed in Shenzhen Stock Exchange, Jiangsu Suning Appliance Group owned 18.29% stake.

In 2009 the Chinese name of the company was changed from Jiangsu Suning Appliance Group Co., Ltd. to Suning Appliance Group Co., Ltd..

Circa 2010s, Liu and Chen were withdrew as a shareholder of Suning Appliance Group Co., Ltd.. The latter still owned an equity stake in Suning Commerce Group directly. Moreover, Bu Yang, a senior staff of Suning Commerce Group, was introduced as a shareholder of Suning Appliance Group Co., Ltd..

In 2013 Zhang owned 39.75% stake, Bu owned 40.17% and Sun owned 20.08%. In the same year, via Hong Kong incorporated subsidiary Suning International Limited, Suning Appliance Group purchased about 1% stake in Hong Kong listed company Hydoo International Holding Limited.

As at the first quarter of 2016, Zhang owned 48.10% stake in Suning Appliance Group Co., Ltd. as the second largest shareholder, Bu was the major shareholder for 49.1% stake, with Sun was the third for 2.8% stake.

Suning Appliance Group Co., Ltd. also owned 7.37% stake in Japanese listed company LAOX, which after Suning Commerce and Nihon Kanko Menzei as the third largest shareholder.

As in 2015, Suning Appliance Group still leasing some properties to Suning Commerce, for example a floor area of 13,182 sq.m in Suning Galaxy International Plaza, on 1 Shanxi Road, Nanjing.

In 2016 Suning Appliance Group Co., Ltd. purchased 100% stake of Jiangsu Football Club, and in 2021 announced that the club would immediately cease operations.

In mid-2016 Suning Appliance Group Co., Ltd. became the third largest shareholder for 15.62% stake, after new shares was issued to Alibaba Group.

Suning Appliance Group also owned 25% stake in Suning Real Estate. In 2017, the company subscribed  new shares of Hengda Real Estate, a subsidiary of Evergrande Group.

Subsidiaries
 Jiangsu F.C.
 Jiangsu Lady Football Club
 Novotel Nanjing Central Suning

Footnotes

References

Companies based in Nanjing
Privately held companies of China
Holding companies of China